Pozal de Gallinas is a municipality located in the province of Valladolid, Castile and León, Spain. According to the 2014 census (INE), the municipality has a population of 538 inhabitants.

References

Municipalities in the Province of Valladolid